Order of precedence in Japan :

Men
 HIM The Emperor
HIM The Emperor Emeritus
 HIH The Crown Prince
 HIH Prince Hisahito of Akishino 
 HIH The Prince Hitachi

Women
 HIM The Empress
HIM The Empress Emerita
 HIH The Princess Toshi
 HIH The Crown Princess
 HIH Princess Kako of Akishino
 HIH The Princess Hitachi
 HIH The Princess Mikasa
 HIH Princess Tomohito of Mikasa
 HIH Princess Akiko of Mikasa
 HIH Princess Yōko of Mikasa
 HIH The Princess Takamado
 HIH Princess Tsuguko of Takamado

Japanese monarchy
Japan